Athletics at the 1959 Mediterranean Games were held in Beirut, Lebanon.

Results

Track

Field

Medal table

Participating nations

References

External links
Complete 1959 Mediterranean Games Standings.

Med
Athletics
1959